Ignacio Martín-Baró  (November 7, 1942 in Valladolid, Castilla y Leon, Spain – November 16, 1989 in San Salvador, El Salvador) was a scholar, social psychologist, philosopher and Jesuit priest. He was one of the victims of the 1989 murders of Jesuits in El Salvador.

Academic career 
Martín-Baró entered the novitiate of the Society of Jesus in Orduña, Spain, on September 28, 1959. Shortly after, he was transferred to the novitiate of Villagarcía and then sent to Central America, where he completed his second year in the novitiate of the Society of Jesus.

At the end of September 1961, he began his studies in classical humanities at the Pontificia Universidad Católica del Ecuador in Quito. On graduating, he travelled to Bogotá, where he studied philosophy at the Pontificia Universidad Javeriana, run by the Jesuits. In 1964 he received his bachelor's degree in philosophy and in 1965 his licentiate (licenciatura) in philosophy and literature. In 1966 he returned to El Salvador, where he got a job as a teacher and academic coordinator at the Externado San José. In 1967, he started teaching at the Universidad Centroamericana "José Simeón Cañas" (UCA).

He travelled to Frankfurt in 1967 to study theology. Returning to San Salvador to continue his studies, he obtained his bachelor's degree from St John Berchmans University College, Heverlee, Belgium, in 1970. He then began studying psychology at UCA, where he was also lecturer. In 1975 he completed his licentiate in psychology.

In 1971 and 1972 he taught psychology in the National Nursing Academy in Santa Ana. Later he was dean of Students between 1972 and 1975, and a member of the University Board, at UCA. From 1971 until 1974 he was head of the editorial board of the academic journal Estudios Centroamericanos (ECA).

In 1977 he earned a master's degree in social sciences from the University of Chicago and two years later, in 1979, a Ph.D. in social and organisational psychology from the same institution. In his master's thesis, he discussed social attitudes and group conflict in El Salvador, a theme which he continued in his doctoral dissertation which focused on population density of the lowest social classes in El Salvador.

On completing his studies he returned to San Salvador, where he lectured in psychology at UCA. By 1981 he was Academic Vice-Rector and member of the Board of Directors. In 1982 he became head of the psychology department. In 1986 he founded and directed the University Institute of Public Opinion, IUDOP. In 1989, the academic vice-rector's office was split in two and Martín-Baró became director of post-graduate studies and research.

He was a member of the editorial board of UCA Editores and Estudios Centroamericanos (ECA), the Salvadoran Journal of Psychology and the Costa Rican magazine Polémica. He was a visiting professor at the Central University of Venezuela, the Universidad del Zulia in Maracaibo, the University of Puerto Rico, Pontificia Universidad Javeriana in Bogotá, Universidad Complutense in Madrid and Universidad de Costa Rica in San José. He was a member of the American Psychological Association as well as the Salvadoran Psychological Association. He was the vice-president of the Mesoamerican division of the Interamerican Psychological Society.

Martín-Baró published eleven books and a long list of cultural and scientific articles, in various Latin American and North American academic journals and magazines.

Ignacio Martín-Baró's Social Psychology
Martín Baró argued that psychology should be developed to address the historical context, the social conditions and aspirations of the people. He believed that students of psychology should learn to analyse human behaviour in the location of their practice, bearing in mind the criteria outlined for that location.

In his writings and lectures he rejected the idea of universal, impartial psychology, and developed a psychology that was critically committed with the projects for alternative societies that existed in Latin America. For him, the psychical situation of individuals could either be an abnormal reaction to normal circumstances, or a normal reaction to abnormal conditions.

For Martín-Baró, the solution to mental health problems in societies characterised by oppression, where "normal abnormality" prevails, is the transformation of society to transcend the historical reality of oppression. Psychologists cannot ignore the influence that difficult contexts have on mental health. Furthermore, if they do, then they become accomplices to the social injustices (or abnormalities) that may have caused these mental health problems.

He integrated diverse theories, and was so convinced of the benefits to be gained by the "de-ideologising" potential of social psychology that he openly questioned the theoretical models of mainstream psychology. He considered the latter inadequate to address the effects of the structural violence that prevailed in El Salvador.

Continuing impact
His work inspired the development of liberation psychology in Latin America and influenced community psychology and some strands of social psychology. His work has also had an influence on some feminist psychology and critical health psychology

Through grant-making and education, the Martín-Baró Fund for Mental Health and Human Rights fosters psychological well-being, social consciousness, active resistance, and progressive social change in communities affected by institutional violence, repression and social injustice.

Quotes by Martín-Baró

Explaining why reparations are a crucial part of the national reconciliation processes:

"It is clear that no one is going to return to the imprisoned dissident his youth; to the young woman who has been raped her innocence; to the person who has been tortured his or her integrity. Nobody is going to return the dead and the disappeared to their families. What can and must be publicly restored [are] the victims' names and their dignity, through a formal recognition of the injustice of what has occurred, and, wherever possible, material reparation.... Those who clamour for social reparation are not asking for vengeance. Nor are they blindly adding difficulties to a historical process that is already by no means easy. On the contrary, they are promoting the personal and social viability of a new society, truly democratic."

Quotes on Martín-Baró

"... a mind that was probing and humane, wide-ranging in interests and passionate in concerns, and dedicated with a rare combination of intelligence and heroism to the challenge his work sets forth to construct a new person in a new society." Noam Chomsky, MIT

"... the major dimensions along which Martín-Baró's work developed: political psychology, war and trauma, and 'de-ideologizing' reality ... his contributions to social psychology as well as his intense involvement in the social reality of his adoptive country, El Salvador ... is required reading for psychologists seeking a more critical psychology—one that takes responsibility for its social position and privilege, and challenges the status quo. It is an equally important resource for those who seek ideas and examples for developing 'indigenous psychology' from the base of marginalized people's lives, in coalition with them." M. Brinton Lykes, World Psychology

Complete Bibliography (Mostly in Spanish)

 1966
 La muerte como problema filosófico (a). ECA 21, 212, 7-12.
 Miguel A. Sholojov, Premio Nobel de Literatura (b). ECA 21, 212, 15-16.
 Un extraño remedio para la homosexualidad: su legalización (c). ECA 21, 213, 54.
 Pablo Antonio Cuadra, tierra y luz nicaragüense (d). ECA 21, 215, 93-95.
 La forja de rebeldes (e). ECA 21, 221, 287-88.

 1967
 La figura del año (a). ECA 22,224, 369-70.
 Rubén Darío, entrevisto (b). ECA 22, 226, 444-45.
 ¿Quién le teme a James Bond? (c). ECA 22, 227, 511-12.

1968
 El pulso del tiempo; guerrilleros y hippies, blow up (a). ECA 23, 234. 25-26.
 El complejo de macho o el "machismo" (b). ECA 23, 235, 38-42. Rpt. 1970, ECA 25, 267, 677-683.
 Propaganda: deseducación social (c). ECA 23, 243, 367-373.

1970
 Psicología de la caricia. ECA, 25, 264, 496-498.

1971
 Problemas actuales en psicopedagogía escolar. ECA 26, 273, 401-413.

1972
 Una nueva pedagogía para una universidad nueva (a). ECA 27, 281-282, 129-145.
 Del alcohol a la marihuana (b). ECA 27, 283, 225-242.
 Peluqueros institucionales (c). ECA 27, 283, 297-301.
 Munich 72: el ocaso de una mitología (d). ECA 27, 288-289, 697-701.
 Presupuestos psicosociales de una caracteriología para nuestros países (e). ECA 27, 290, 763-786. En A. Blanco (Ed.), Psicología de la Liberación. Madrid: Editorial Trotta, 1998, bajo el título "Presupuestos psico-sociales del carácter", Capítulo I, pp. 39–71.
 Del futuro, la técnica y el planeta de los simios (f). ECA 27, 290, 795-799.
 Hacia una docencia liberadora (g). Universidades (México), 50, 9-26.
 Psicodiagnóstico de América Latina (h). San Salvador: UCA editores.
 La desatención social del poder oppressor (i). En 1972 (h) pp. 121–140. Rpt. 1976, pp. 98–109.

1973
 Algunas repercusiones psico-sociales de la densidad demográfica en El Salvador (a). ECA 28, 293-294, 123-132. Rpt. 1977(a), pp. 429–442.
 Antipsiquiatría y psicoanálisis (b). ECA 28, 293-94, 203-206.
 Cartas al presidente: reflexiones psicosociales sobre un caso del personalismo político en El Salvador (c). ECA, 28, 296, 345-57.
 Psicología del campesino salvadoreño (c). ECA 28, 297-298, 476-495.

 1974
 ¿Quién es pueblo?: reflexiones para una definición del concepto de pueblo (a). ECA 29, 303-4, 11-20. Traducción al inglés en Adrianne Aron y Shawn Corne (Eds.), Writings for a Liberation Psychology. Ignacio Martín-Baró. Cambridge: Harvard University Press, 1996, Capítulo 10, pp. 173–185. 
 Elementos de conscientización socio-política en los curricula de las universidades (c). ECA 29, 313-314, 765-783. En A. Blanco (Ed.), Psicología de la Liberación. Madrid: Editorial Trotta, 1998, bajo el título "Concientización y currículos universitarios", Capítulo II, pp. 131–159. Traducción al inglés en John Hasset y Hugh Lacey (Eds.), Toward a Society that Serves its People: The Intellectual Contributions of El Salvador's Murdered Jesuits. Washington, D.C.: Georgetown University Press, 1991, pp. 138–140. 
 De la evasión a la invasión (b). ABRA (El Salvador), 0, 19-24.

1975
 Culpabilidad religiosa en un barrio popular (a). Tesina de licenciatura en Psicología. UCA de El Salvador (inédito).
  (b). ECA 30, 319-320, 265-282.
 El estudiantado y la estructura universitaria (c). ECA 30, 324-25, 638-51.
 El valor psicológico de la represión política mediante la violencia (d). ECA 30, 326, 742-752. Rpt. 1976(a), pp. 310–327. Traducción al inglés en Adrianne Aron y Shawn Corne (Eds.), Writings for a Liberation Psychology. Ignacio Martín-Baró. Cambridge: Harvard University Press, 1996, Capítulo 9, pp. 149–172. 
 Elementos de conscientización en los curricula universitarios (e). Guatemala: FUPAC.

1976
 Problemas de psicología social en América Latina (compilación de textos). San Salvador: UCA editores.

1977
 Psicología, ciencia y conciencia (compilación de textos) (a). San Salvador: UCA editores.
 Del cociente intellectual al cociente racial (b). ECA 32, 345, 485-494.
 Social Attitudes and Group Conflict in El Salvador (a). Tesina de Master en Ciencias Sociales. Universidad de Chicago (inédito).

1978
 Vivienda mínima: obra máxima (a). ECA 33, 359, 732-33.
 Ley y orden en la vida del mesón (Con M. Herrera) (b). ECA 33, 360, 803-828.

1979
 Cien años de psicología (a). ECA 34, 368, 432-433.
 Household Density and Crowding in Lower-Class Salvadorans (b). Tesis doctoral. Universidad de Chicago (inédito).
 Haciendo la universidad (compilación de textos) (c). Guatemala: FUPAC.

1980
 Monseñor: una voz para un pueblo pisoteado (a). En John Sobrino, Ignacio Martín-Baró y R. Cardenal (eds.), La voz de los sin voz: la palabra viva de Monseñor Oscar Arnulfo Romero. San Salvador: UCA editores, pp. 13–34. Rpt. 1990, Christus, 55, 632, 28-38.
 Fantasmas sobre un gobierno popular en El Salvador (b). ECA 35, 377-378, 277-290.
 Ocupación juvenil: reflexiones psicosociales de un rehén por 24 horas (c). ECA 35, 379, 463-474.
 Desde Cuba y sin amor (d). ECA 35, 379, 485-486.
 La imagen de la mujer en El Salvador (e). ECA 35, 380, 557-568.
 A la muerte de Piaget (f). ECA 35, 383, 869-871.
 El psicólogo en el proceso revolucionario (g). San Salvador (inédito).
 Genocidio en El Salvador (h). San Salvador (inédito).
 Household density and crowding in lower-class Salvadorans (i). Dissertation Abstracts International 40, 10-B, 5077-5078.

1981
 La guerra civil en El Salvador (a). ECA 36, 387-388, 17-32.
 El liderazgo del Monseñor Romero: un análisis psicosocial (b). ECA 36, 389, 152-172.
 Actitudes en El Salvador ante una solución política a la guerra civil (c). ECA 36, 390-91, 325-348.
 Aspiraciones del pequeño burgués salvadoreño (e). ECA 36, 394, 773-788.
 Las raíces psicosociales de la guerra en El Salvador (a). San Salvador (inédito).

1982
 Una juventud sin liderazgo político (a). Boletín de Psicología de El Salvador 1, 5, 8-10
 El llamado de la extrema derecha (b). ECA 37, 403-404, 453-466. Traducción al inglés en John Hasset y Hugh Lacey (Eds.), Toward a Society that Serves its People: The Intellectual Contributions of El Salvador's Murdered Jesuits. Washington, D.C.: Georgetown University Press, 1991, pp. 293–305. 
 Un psicólogo social ante la guerra civil en El Salvador (a). Revista de la asociación latinoamericana de Psicología social, 2, 91-111.
¿Escuela o prisión? La organización social de un centro de orientación en El Salvador (Con V. Iraheta y A. Lemus de Vides) (c). ECA 37, 401, 179-92.

1983
 Acción e ideología: psicología social desde Centroamérica (a). San Salvador: UCA editores.
 Los rasgos femeninos según la cultura dominante en El Salvador (b). Boletín de Psicología de El Salvador 2, 8, 3-7.
 Polarización social en El Salvador (c). ECA 38, 412, 129-142.
 Los sectores medios ante el plan Reagan: una perspectiva sombría (d). ECA 38, 415-416 517-522.
 Estacazo imperial: abuso y mentira en Granada (e). ECA 39, 421-22, 1018-21.

1984
 La necesidad de votar: actitudes del pueblo salvadoreño ante el proceso electoral de 1984 (Con V. A. Orellana) (a). ECA 39, 426-427, 253-264.
 El último discurso de Alvaro Magaña (b). ECA 39, 428, 425-427.
 Guerra y salud mental (c). ECA 39, 429-30, 503-514. Rpt. 1990a, pp. 71–88; 1990(c), pp. 23–40; Traducción al inglés en Adrianne Aron y Shawn Corne (Eds.), Writings for a Liberation Psychology. Ignacio Martín-Baró. Cambridge: Harvard University Press, 1996, Capítulo 6, pp. 108–121. 
 El terrorismo del estado norteamericano (d). ECA 39, 433, 813-816.
 La sumisión à la autoridad como valor social en El Salvador (e). Boletín de Psicología de El Salvador 3, 11, 19-26.
 Psicología social V: Sistema y poder (f). San Salvador: UCA Editores.
 Informes sobre la población de solicitantes al proyecto "Popotlán" de la FUNDASAL (Con C. King) (g). San Salvador: UCA (inédito).

1985
 La desideologización como aporte de la psicología social al desarrollo de la democracia en Latinoamérica (a). Boletín de la Asociación Venezolana de Psicología Social (AVEPSO) 8, 3, 3-9. En A. Blanco (Ed.), Psicología de la Liberación. Madrid: Editorial Trotta, 1998, bajo el título "El papel desenmascarador del psicólogo", Capítulo II, pp. 177–186.
 Valores del universitario salvadoreño de primer ingreso (b). Boletín de Psicología de El Salvador 4, 15, 5-12.
 De la conciencia religiosa a la conciencia política (c). Boletín de Psicología de El Salvador, 4, 16, 72-82.
 El papel del psicólogo en el contexto centroamericano (d). Boletín de Psicología de El Salvador 4, 17, 99-112. Rpt. 1990(a), pp. 53–70. En A. Blanco (Ed.), Psicología de la Liberación. Madrid: Editorial Trotta, 1998, bajo el título "El papel desenmascarador del psicólogo", Capítulo II, pp. 161–177. Traducción al inglés en Adrianne Aron y Shawn Corne (Eds.), Writings for a Liberation Psychology. Ignacio Martín-Baró. Cambridge: Harvard University Press, 1996, Capítulo 2, pp. 33–46. 
 La encuesta de opinión pública como instrumento desideologizador (e). Cuadernos de Psicología (Universidad del Valle, Cali) 7, 1-2, 93-108. Rpt. 1990(a), pp. 9–22; En A. Blanco (Ed.), Psicología de la Liberación. Madrid: Editorial Trotta, 1998, bajo el título "El papel desenmascarador del psicólogo", Capítulo II, pp. 186–199. Traducción al inglés en Adrianne Aron y Shawn Corne (Eds.), Writings for a Liberation Psychology. Ignacio Martín-Baró. Cambridge: Harvard University Press, 1996, Capítulo 11, pp. 186–197. 
 El trabajador social salvadoreño: situación y actitudes (f). ECA 40, 438, 229-240.
 La oferta política de Duarte (g). ECA 40, 439-440. 345-356.
 El hacinamiento residencial: ideologización y verdad de un problema real (h). Revista de Psicología social (México) 1, 31-50. Rpt. 1990 (b).
 "Los niños desplazados en El Salvador: Problemas y tratamiento" (i). Trabajo presentado en el Taller de intercambio de experiencias sobre el rtabajo psicosocial y psicoterapéutico con los niños y la población desplazada, patrocinado por Rädda Barnen, México, Feb. 18-22.
  (j). Trabajo presentado en el Vigésimo Congreso Interamericano de Psicología, Caracas. Rpt. 1992(b), pp. 317–338.
 Psicología latinoamericana (k). Editorial. Boletín de Psicología de El Salvador, 4,21,39-41.
 Iglesia y revolución en El Salvador (l). Conferencia pronunciada en la Midwest Association for Latin American Studies en la Universidad de Columbia, septiembre, 20. Publicado en 1989(n) y en A. Blanco (Ed.), Psicología de la Liberación. Madrid: Editorial Trotta, 1998, Capítulo III, pp. 203–225.

1986
 La ideología familiar en El Salvador (a). ECA 41, 450, 291-304.
 El pueblo salvadoreño ante el diálogo (b). ECA 41, 454-455, 755-768.
 Socialización política: dos temas críticos (c). Boletín de Psicología de El Salvador, 19, 5-20. Traducción al inglés en Adrianne Aron y Shawn Corne (Eds.), Writings for a Liberation Psychology. Ignacio Martín-Baró. Cambridge: Harvard University Press, 1996, Capítulo 4, pp. 68–83. 
 Hacia una psicología de la liberación (d). Boletín de Psicología de El Salvador, 5, 22, 219-231. En A. Blanco (Ed.), Psicología de la Liberación. Madrid: Editorial Trotta, 1998, Capítulo IV, pp. 283–302.
 La ideología de los sectores medios salvadoreños (e). Revista Mexicana de Psicología, 3, 1, 59-65.

1987
 Así piensan los salvadoreños urbanos (1986–1987) (a). San Salvador: UCA editores.
 Del opio religioso a la fe libertadora (b). En M. Montero (ed.), Psicología política latinoamericana. Caracas: Panapo, 1987; En A. Blanco (Ed.), Psicología de la Liberación. Madrid: Editorial Trotta, 1998, Capítulo III, pp. 245–280. Traducción al inglés en John Hasset y Hugh Lacey (Eds.), Toward a Society that Serves its People: The Intellectual Contributions of El Salvador's Murdered Jesuits. Washington, D.C.: Georgetown University Press, 1991, pp. 347–370. 
 El Latino indolente: carácter ideológico del fatalismo latinoamericano (c). En M. Montero (Ed.), Psicología política latinoamericana. Caracas: Panapo, 1987; A. Blanco (Ed.), Psicología de la Liberación. Madrid: Editorial Trotta, 1998, bajo el título "El Latino indolente", Capítulo I, pp. 73–101. Traducción al inglés en Adrianne Aron y Shawn Corne (Eds.), Writings for a Liberation Psychology. Ignacio Martín-Baró. Cambridge: Harvard University Press, 1996, Capítulo 12, pp. 198–220. 
 Votar en El Salvador: psicología social del desorden político (d). Boletín de la Asociación Venezolana de Psicología Social (AVEPSO), 10, 2, 28-36.
 ¿Es machista el salvadoreño? (e). Boletín de Psicología de El Salvador, 6, 24, 101-122.
 El reto popular à la psicología social en América Latina (f). Boletín de Psicología de El Salvador 6, 26, 251-270. En A. Blanco (Ed.), Psicología de la Liberación. Madrid: Editorial Trotta, 1998, bajo el título "La liberación como horizonte de la psicología", Capítulo IV, pp. 303–321. Conferencia pronunciada en el XXI Congreso Interamericano de Psicología celebrado en La Habana.
 Psicología social desde Centroamérica: Retos y perspectivas (g). Entrevista. Revista Costarricense de Psicología, 5, 71-76.
 Procesos psíquicos y poder (h). Manuscrito. En M. Montero (Ed.), Psicología de la acción política. Barcelona: Paidós, 1995. Traducción al inglés en Adrianne Aron y Shawn Corne (Eds.), Writings for a Liberation Psychology. Ignacio Martín-Baró. Cambridge: Harvard University Press, 1996, Capítulo 3, pp. 47–67. 

1988
 From Dirty War to Psychological War: The case of El Salvador (a). En Adrianne Aron (ed.), Flight, Exile and Return: Mental Health and the Refugee. San Francisco: CHRICA. Rpt. 1990(a), pp. 109–122; 1990(c), pp. 159–173. Rpt. en John Hasset y Hugh Lacey (Eds.), Toward a Society that Serves its People: The Intellectual Contributions of El Salvador's Murdered Jesuits. Washington, D.C.: Georgetown University Press, 1991, pp. 306–316. .
 La violencia política y la guerra como causas del trauma psicosocial en El Salvador (b). Revista de Psicología de El Salvador, 7, 28, 123-141. Rpt. Revista Costarricense de Psicología 12, 13, 21-34; 1990(a), pp. 89–107; 1990(c), pp. 65–84; Traducciones al inglés en: International Journal of Mental Health, 18, 1, (1989), pp. 3–20; Journal of La Raza Studies [San Francisco State University] 2, 1, (1990), pp. 5–13; Manchester Guardian Weekly (Enero 14, 1990), 23-35; En John Sobrino y Ignacio Ellacuria (Eds.), Companions of Jesus: The Jesuit Martyrs of El Salvador (Orbis Books, 1990) pp. 79–97. 
 La mujer salvadoreña y los medios de comunicación masiva (c). Revista de Psicología de El Salvador 7, 29, 253-266.
 La violencia en Centroamérica: una visión psicosocial (d). Revista de Psicología de El Salvador 7, 28, 123-41. Rpt. 1990(c), pp. 123–146; Traducción al inglés en John Hasset y Hugh Lacey (Eds.), Toward a Society that Serves its People: The Intellectual Contributions of El Salvador's Murdered Jesuits. Washington, D.C.: Georgetown University Press, 1991, pp. 333–346. .
 El Salvador 1987 (e). ECA 43, 471-472, 21-45.
 Opinión preelectoral y sentido del voto en El Salvador (f). ECA 43, 473-474, 213-223.
 Consecuencias psicológicas del terrorismo político (e). San Salvador (inédito).
 Los grupos con historia: un modelo psicosocial (h). Boletín de la Asociación Venezolana de Psicología Social (AVEPSO), 11, 1, 3-18. Rpt. 1992.
 Guerra y trauma psicosocial del niño salvadoreño (i). Trabajo presentado en conferencia de ACISAM, septiembre 12. Rpt. 1990(c), pp. 233–249; Traducción al inglés en Adrianne Aron y Shawn Corne (Eds.), Writings for a Liberation Psychology. Ignacio Martín-Baró. Cambridge: Harvard University Press, 1996, Capítulo 7, pp. 122–135. 

1989
 La opinión pública salvadoreña (1987–1988) (a). San Salvador: UCA editores.
 La opinión pública salvadoreña ante los primeros cien días del gobierno de Cristiani (b). ECA 44, 490-491, 715-726.
 Psicología política del trabajo en América Latina (c). Revista de Psicología de El Salvador 8, 31, 5-25. Traducción al inglés en Adrianne Aron y Shawn Corne (Eds.), Writings for a Liberation Psychology. Ignacio Martín-Baró. Cambridge: Harvard University Press, 1996, Capítulo 5, pp. 84–102. 
 Los medios de comunicación masiva y la opinión pública en El Salvador de 1979 a 1989 (d). ECA 44, 493-494, 1081-1093.
 Review of F. J. Hinkelammert ("La fe de Abraham y el edipo occidental") (e). Revista Latinoamericana de Teología 6, 17, 241-43.
 Sistema, grupo y poder: psicología social desde Centroamérica II (f) San Salvador: UCA editores.
 Asking Questions in El Salvador: As Dangerous as Expressing Them (g). Entrevista. M. Brinton Lykes, Links 6, 2, 10.
 Encuestas pre-electorales en El Salvador (h). ECA 44, 485, 229-232.
 Introducción (i). En E. Lira (ed.), Todo es del dolor con que se mira. Santiago de Chile: ILAS. Traducción al inglés en: Commonwealth (Marzo 23, 1990) y John Hasset y Hugh Lacey (Eds.), Toward a Society that Serves its People: The Intellectual Contributions of El Salvador's Murdered Jesuits. Washington, D.C.: Georgetown University Press, 1991, pp. 138–140. .
 La institucionalización de la guerra (j). Revista de Psicología de El Salvador 8, 33, 223-45.
 The Psychologic Consequences of Political Terrorism (k). Video y transcripción del trabajo presentado en el simposium realizado por el Committee for Health Rights in Central America (CHICRA), Berkeley, CA, enero 17.
 Retos y perspectivas de la psicología latinoamericana (l). En G. Pacheco y B. Jiménez (Eds.), Ignacio Martín-Baró (1942–1989). Psicología de la liberación para América Latina. Guadalajara: ITESO, pp. 51–79 y en A. Blanco (Ed.), Psicología de la Liberación. Madrid: Editorial Trotta, 1998, bajo el título "La liberación como horizonte de la psicología", Capítulo IV, pp. 321–341. Conferencia pronunciada en la Universidad de Guadalajara, Mayo 24.
 Sólo Dios salva. Sentido político de la conversión religiosa (m). Revista chilena de Psicología 10, 1, 13-20.
 Iglesia y revolución en El Salvador (n). Boletín de la Asociación Venezolana de Psicología Social (AVEPSO), 12, 27-39.

1990
 La encuesta de opinión pública como instrumento desideologizador (a). Revista de Psicología de El Salvador 9, 35, pp. 9–22.
 El hacinamiento residencial: ideologización y verdad de un problema real (b). Revista de Psicología de El Salvador 9, 35, pp. 23–51.
La violencia en Centroamérica: una visión psicosocial (c). Revista de Psicología de El Salvador 35, pp. 123–146
 ¿Trabajador alegre o trabajador explotado? La identidad nacional del salvadoreño (d). Revista de Psicología de El Salvador 9, 35, 147-172. En A. Blanco (Ed.), Psicología de la Liberación. Madrid: Editorial Trotta, 1998, bajo el título "El Latino explotado", Capítulo I, pp. 103–128.
 Religion as an Instrument of Psychological Warfare (e). Journal of Social Issues 46, 93-107. Traducción al español en A. Blanco (Ed.), Psicología de la Liberación. Madrid: Editorial Trotta, 1998, bajo el título "Religión y guerra psicológica", Capítulo III, pp. 227–244.
 Psicología social de la guerra: trauma y terapia (compilación de textos)(f). San Salvador: UCA editores.
 Guerra y trauma psicosocial del niño salvadoreño (g). En I. Martín-Baró (ed.), Psicología social de la guerra: trauma y terapia. San Salvador: UCA editores.
 La familia, puerta y cárcel para la mujer salvadoreña (h). Revista de Psicología de El Salvador 9, 37, pp. 265–277.
 Entrevista con Ignacio Martín-Baró (i). En E. Cabrera, Revista de Psicología de El Salvador 9, 37, pp. 299–308.
 Reparations: Attention Must be Paid (j). Commonweal, 23 de Marzo.
 Psicología social de la liberación para América Latina. Ignacio Martín-Baró (1942–1989) (k). Gerardo Pacheco y Bernardo Jiménez (comps.). Guadalajara: ITESO/Universidad de Guadalajara.

1992
 Los grupos con historia: un modelo psicosocial (a). Revista de Psicología de El Salvador, 43, 1992, pp. 7–29.
  (b). Revista de Psicología de El Salvador, 46, 1992, pp. 317–338.

1993
 Prólogo en Emperatriz Arreaza Camero, La iglesia—institución de dominación o liberación? Caso Venezuela: ensayo exploratorio hacia una teoría crítica del control social. Maracaibo: La Universidad del Zulia, Instituto de Criminología, Consejo de Desarrollo Científico y Humanístico.

1994
 El método de la Psicología política (a). San Salvador (inédito).
 Writings for a Liberation Psychology. Ignacio Martín-Baró (b). Edited by Adrianne Aron and Shawn Corne. Cambribge, MA: Harvard University Press. 

1995
 Procesos psíquicos y poder. En M. Montero (ed.), Psicología de la acción política. Barcelona: Paidós.

1998
 Imágenes sociales en El Salvador (a). Revista de Psicología General y Applicada, Vol. 51, No.3-4.
 Psicología de la Liberación (b). Edición e introducción de Amalio Blanco. Epílogo de Noam Chomsky. Madrid: Editorial Trotta.
 Compilation based in Luis de la Corte (1999), Adrianne Aron y Shawn Corne (1996), Amalio Blanco (1998), G. Pacheco and B. Jiménez (1990). Source Psychology Department, UCA. https://web.archive.org/web/20071007012612/http://di.uca.edu.sv/deptos/psicolog/

References

External Sources on Martín-Baró
 Digital Collection Ignacio Martín-Baró 
 http://tech.mit.edu/V105/N20/baro.20n.html
 http://www.martinbarofund.org

1942 births
1989 deaths
Martyred Roman Catholic priests
Catholic martyrs of El Salvador
Jesuit martyrs
Assassinated Salvadoran people
Social psychologists
Latin Americanists
Roman Catholic missionaries in El Salvador
Spanish people murdered abroad
Assassinated Spanish people
People murdered in El Salvador
20th-century Spanish Jesuits
Spanish philosophers
People of the Salvadoran Civil War
20th-century Roman Catholic martyrs
People from Valladolid
20th-century executions by El Salvador
20th-century Spanish Roman Catholic theologians
20th-century Spanish philosophers
Spanish Roman Catholic missionaries
Jesuit missionaries
Academic staff of Central American University
1989 crimes in El Salvador
1989 murders in North America
1980s murders in El Salvador
Salvadoran psychologists
Pontifical Xavierian University alumni